This is a list of San Diego State Aztecs football players in the NFL Draft.

Key

Selections

References

San Diego State

San Diego State Aztecs in the NFL Draft
San Diego State Aztecs NFL Draft
San Diego State Aztecs NFL Draft